"Little Darlin'" is a popular Top 40 song, made famous by the Diamonds.

The Gladiolas' version
It was written by Maurice Williams with both melody and doo-wop accompaniment strongly emphasizing the clave rhythm. It was first recorded by Excello Records in January 1957 and quickly released as a rhythm-and-blues song by Williams' R&B group, the Gladiolas. The song is noted for its spoken recitation by the lead singer ("My Darlin' I need you..."). The Gladiolas, featuring Williams, were from Lancaster, South Carolina, where they had been together since high school. Their original version of the song was on the small Excello label. (Excello primarily recording "swamp blues" songs in Crowley, Louisiana.) The Gladiolas song peaked at No. 11 on the R&B charts in April 1957, but barely dented the Hot 100. By 1959, Williams' group became "Maurice Williams and the Zodiacs" with the rock 'n roll-R&B hit "Stay."

The Gladiolas' version was included in Robert Christgau's "Basic Record Library" of 1950s and 1960s recordings, published in Christgau's Record Guide: Rock Albums of the Seventies (1981).

The Diamonds' version
The Diamonds' successful cover version followed a month later. The Diamonds were a Canadian pop group that evolved into a doo-wop group. The Diamonds' version reached number two in sales for eight weeks on the Billboard Hot 100. Billboard ranked this version as the No. 3 song for 1957. In Canada, the song was No. 11 on the premiere CHUM Chart, May 27, 1957.
 
The Diamonds' version is generally considered superior. Allmusic critic Stephen Thomas Erlewine argues that the Diamonds "Little Darlin'" is an unusual example of a cover being better than the original:[T]he Diamonds' take remained the bigger hit, and over the years, the better-known version. Normally, this would have been an outrage, but there's a reason why the Diamonds' version has sustained its popularity over the years: it's a better, fiercer recording. Both versions are good, even if they're a little silly, because it's a good doo wop song, giving each member of the quartet a lot to do. At times, the vocal phrases verge on self-parody -- the "ai-ya-yi-yai-yai-ya"'s or the "wella-wella"'s -- which may be why The Diamonds' version is superior.

On the Pop Chronicles, host John Gilliland claimed that their version was in fact a parody of the genre. Nonetheless, "Little Darlin'" (primarily the Diamonds' version, but to some extent the Gladiolas' version) remains an all-time rock 'n roll R&B classic.

Other recordings
 Elvis Presley performed the song and a version appears on his final album, Moody Blue (1977).
 Rock-and-roll-revival group Sha Na Na performed "Little Darlin'" at the Woodstock Festival in 1969.
 The Four Seasons
 The Monkees performed a live version on their 1969 TV special 33⅓ Revolutions Per Monkee.
 Joan Baez performed a parody version in concert in the early 1960s which appears on the 1983 compilation Very Early Joan. The title song of her album Honest Lullaby (1979) quotes the vocal hook of "Little Darlin".
 Classics IV
 The Rocky Fellers
 The Chevrons
 Victor Wood (1971)

In popular culture
 The recording by The Diamonds is featured on the soundtrack of the 1973 film American Graffiti and the 1990 film Hello Hemingway.
 The song is performed by Warren Beatty and Dustin Hoffman in the 1987 film Ishtar.
 Elton John quotes this song in his 1972 hit Crocodile Rock.

See also

1957 in music

References

1957 singles
The Diamonds songs
Elvis Presley songs
Mercury Records singles
Swan Song Records singles